Kentucky Route 1871 (KY 1871) is a  state highway in the U.S. state of Kentucky. The route is located entirely in Shelby County.

Route description

The route originates at a junction with US Route 60 (US 60) in Shelbyville and is known as Rocket Lane for the first , since Shelby County High School is located at the intersection of US 60 and KY 1871. After that point, KY 1871 meets the southern terminus of KY 1779 and becomes known as Cranbourne Grange until it meets its northern terminus at KY 1005. The entire route is located in a mostly residential area with subdivisions and homes lining most of the route.

Major intersections

References

External links

 

1871
1871
Shelbyville, Kentucky